This is a list of wadis in Djibouti. Wadis are either permanently or intermittently dry riverbeds, of which Djibouti has several. However, it does not have any permanent rivers.

This list is arranged by drainage basin, with respective tributaries indented under each larger stream's name.

Bab-el-Mandeb
We'ima 
Alailou
Essulou
Ga'lale
Boussali
Goutoi (Kadda Dola)
Soudi

Gulf of Tadjoura
Obock
Sadai 
Ambado
Ambouli
Deydey
Beyadé
Ouâhayyi

Danakil Desert
Gabone
Kalou (flows into Lake Assal)
Hanlé 
Degbour (flows into Lake Abbe)

References
Division Géographique du Ministère des Affaires étrangères, 1990
Ezilon Maps, 2009

Djibouti
Rivers